Synaphe moldavica is a species of moth of the family Pyralidae described by Eugenius Johann Christoph Esper in 1794. It is found in Portugal, Spain, Italy, Austria, Slovakia, Hungary, Croatia, Bosnia and Herzegovina, Romania, Bulgaria, North Macedonia, Albania, Greece, Moldova, Ukraine, Russia, Turkey and Iran.

The wingspan is 28–30 mm.

The larvae feed on Gramineae species.

References

Moths described in 1794
Pyralini
Moths of Europe
Moths of Asia